Verner Dalskov (1 January 1932 – 1 September 2017) was born in the town of Allested-Vejle, Denmark. He was a member of the Socialdemokratiet and was mayor of Odense from 1973 to 1993 at which time he was followed by Anker Boye.

References

External links
Profile at sampension

1932 births
2017 deaths
Mayors of Odense
Social Democrats (Denmark) politicians